The Northern Cyprus Turkish Scouts is a Scouting federation active in the de facto independent Turkish Republic of Northern Cyprus, and has strong ties to the Scouting and Guiding Federation of Turkey.

References
http://www.avrupagazete.com/avrupa.asp?Id=5209 
http://www.tif.org.tr/haberler/2006/mart/21/tif_pro.html

External links
 Official website

Scouting and Guiding in Cyprus
Organisations based in Northern Cyprus